Konstantin Mikhailovich Zakharov (born 2 May 1985 in Minsk, Byelorussian SSR, Soviet Union) is a Belarusian former ice hockey right winger. He played for HC Dinamo Minsk of the KHL. Internationally he played for the Belarusian national team at multiple tournaments

Playing career
Zakharov made his senior debut playing for Yunost Minsk, then moved to HK Gomel, playing at better than a point per game pace in the Belarusian Extraliga. After being drafted by the St. Louis Blues in the 2003 NHL Entry Draft, he moved to the QMJHL, with the Moncton Wildcats. He scored 33 goals in Moncton, helping his team to make the President's Cup final. After that season, he moved to St. Louis' AHL affiliate, the Worcester IceCats. However, he had just 14 points in 59 games, and the next season split time between the Alaska Aces of the ECHL and Yunost Minsk in the Belarusian Extraliga. He returned to North America for the start of 2006-07, playing with the Peoria Rivermen, but returned home at the end of the season, again playing with Yunost, where he has played since, helping the team to three consecutive league titles between 2009 and 2011.

Zakharov played four games for Kontinental Hockey League team HC Dinamo Minsk in 2009-10, returning to Yunost Minsk after that.

International career
Zakharov was selected for the Belarus national men's ice hockey team in the 2010 Winter Olympics, playing in four games and scoring a goal, in the shootout loss to Switzerland that eliminated Belarus from the tournament.

As of 2013, that was Zakharov's only time representing Belarus at the senior level, but he played  multiple times for both the under-20 and under-18 teams. He competed in four World Junior Ice Hockey Championships, the first coming in 2001 World Junior Ice Hockey Championships, when he was just 15. In 2003, he was the leading scorer at the Under-18 championships, recording more points than future stars Alexander Ovechkin and Evgeni Malkin.

Career statistics

Regular season and playoffs

International

References

External links
 

1985 births
Living people
Alaska Aces (ECHL) players
Belarusian ice hockey right wingers
HC Dinamo Minsk players
Ice hockey players at the 2010 Winter Olympics
Moncton Wildcats players
Olympic ice hockey players of Belarus
Peoria Rivermen (AHL) players
St. Louis Blues draft picks
Ice hockey people from Minsk
Worcester IceCats players
Yunost Minsk players